The 1947 Bulgarian Cup was the 7th season of the Bulgarian Cup (in this period the tournament was named Cup of the Soviet Army). In the tournament entered the 10 winners of regional cup competitions. Levski Sofia won the competition, beating Botev Plovdiv 1–0 in the final at the Yunak Stadium in Sofia.

First round

|-
!colspan="3" style="background-color:#D0F0C0; text-align:left;" |Replay

|}

Quarter-finals

|}

Semi-finals

|}

Final

Details

References

1947
1946–47 domestic association football cups
Cup